Robert Daly (born 26 January 1978) is an Irish sprinter who specializes in the 400 metres.

Daly won the bronze medal in 4 x 400 metres relay at the 2004 World Indoor Championships, together with teammates Gary Ryan, David Gillick and David McCarthy.

His personal best time is 45.98 seconds, was achieved in July 2004 in Dublin.

External links

1978 births
Living people
Irish male sprinters
Athletes (track and field) at the 2000 Summer Olympics
Olympic athletes of Ireland
World Athletics Indoor Championships medalists